Matthew Guillaumier (born 9 April 1998) is a Maltese footballer who plays as a midfielder for Ħamrun Spartans and the Malta national team.

Club career
Guillaumier began his youth career with St. Andrews at the age of five. On 26 April 2013, he made his debut for the senior team in a First Division match against Gudja United, aged only 15 years and 17 days. In the match he played alongside his uncle, midfielder Joseph Farrugia. In September 2013, after trials with English clubs Birmingham City and West Bromwich Albion, he joined the youth academy of Italian club Empoli, with whom he had trained with regularly in the year prior.

In 2015, he returned to St. Andrews, making sixteen appearances in the Maltese Premier League. In January 2016, he moved to Birkirkara on a 4.5-year contract, lasting until 2020. On the 29 September 2020 he moved to Ħamrun Spartans for a record fee in Malta of €300,000. In the same season, after winning his first Maltese Premier League title, he received the award as Maltese Player of the Year.

On 31 January 2022, Guillaumier joined Siena in the Italian third-tier Serie C on loan with an option to buy.

International career
Guillaumier was included in the squad of hosts Malta for the 2014 UEFA European Under-17 Championship. He appeared in all three matches, with the team eliminated in the group stage. He made his international debut for Malta on 23 March 2019, starting in a UEFA Euro 2020 qualifying home match against the Faroe Islands, which finished as a 2–1 home win. The match was Malta's first competitive home win, as well as their first UEFA European Championship qualifying win, since October 2006.

Career statistics

Club

International

International goals
Scores and results list Malta's goal tally first.

Honours

Player

Ħamrun Spartans
 Maltese Premier League: 2020–21

Individual
 Maltese Player of the Year: 2020–21

References

External links
 
 
 

1998 births
Living people
Maltese footballers
Association football midfielders
Maltese Premier League players
St. Andrews F.C. players
Birkirkara F.C. players
Ħamrun Spartans F.C. players
Serie C players
A.C.N. Siena 1904 players
Maltese expatriate footballers
Maltese expatriate sportspeople in Italy
Expatriate footballers in Italy
Malta youth international footballers
Malta under-21 international footballers
Malta international footballers